Cracks is a debut album by Danish singer, songwriter, and actress Nabiha. The album is in English.

Track listing

More Cracks

On September 20, 2011, Nabiha released More Cracks as her debut album internationally. This version includes eight songs from Cracks with four new tracks.

Release history 
Cracks

More Cracks

References

External links 
 

2010 debut albums
Nabiha albums
Border Breakers albums